Overclocked may refer to:

Overclocked: Stories of the Future Present, collection of short stories by Cory Doctorow
Overclocked: A History of Violence, a 2008 video game
Overclocked (album), a 2011 album by Jim Allchin
OverClocked ReMix, a non-profit organization dedicated to preserving and paying tribute to video game music
Overclocking, configuration of computer hardware to operate at a faster rate than certified by the manufacturer